Beyond the Lights is a 2014 American romantic drama film directed and written by Gina Prince-Bythewood. The film stars Gugu Mbatha-Raw, Nate Parker, Minnie Driver, Machine Gun Kelly, and Danny Glover. The film premiered at the 2014 Toronto International Film Festival on September 7, 2014, and was released theatrically in the United States on November 14, 2014. In 2015, the song "Grateful" was nominated for the Academy Award for Best Original Song.

Plot
In 1998 in London, a young Noni Jean is taken by her mother Macy to a salon to get her hair done before her performance at a talent contest. Noni is happy to win second place for her performance of Nina Simone's "Blackbird", but her mother refuses to accept anything but first place and forces Noni to smash her trophy on the ground.

In the present, Noni Jean is a hot new artist who has just won a Billboard Music Award for her collaboration with her boyfriend Kid Culprit and is primed for superstardom. However, the pressures of success cause her to nearly end her life by falling off a hotel balcony. She is saved by a young police officer, Kaz Nicol. Noni's team, including her mother, tells the media in a press conference that she fell by accident. Kaz, who has political ambitions, is not happy to be forced to lie to the media, and is initially cold to Noni. However, he later apologizes to her. Gradually, they connect and begin to fall in love, despite her mother's disapproval. Noni tells Kaz about the songs she has secretly written, and he is supportive of her creative ambitions. Noni decides to end the romantic relationship with Kid Culprit that her team has encouraged.

In spite of her team's attempt to cover it up, rumors persist that Noni attempted suicide, and her label tells Macy (who is also Noni's manager) that her record contract is conditional on a successful upcoming performance. However, during the performance, Kid Culprit sexually assaults and humiliates her, claiming that Noni attempted suicide because he'd broken up with her. He tries to strip Noni's clothes off on stage when Kaz rushes in to rescue her and punches Kid Culprit in her defense. Following this, Noni loses her record contract and is at a low point emotionally, so Kaz takes her on a trip to Mexico away from the spotlight where they enjoy each other's company. Noni gets rid of her old hairstyle in favor of her natural hair, and a trip to a local karaoke bar leads to Noni giving an emotional performance of "Blackbird." The performance is uploaded to the internet and goes viral, causing Noni's mother and the paparazzi to find her. Macy tells Noni that the viral success of her performance has caused her record label to reconsider, and Noni agrees to return home. Kaz tells Noni he is not convinced that anything will be different than it was before, and their relationship is put on pause.

Noni wants to add a song she has written to her upcoming album, but Macy refuses. The two fight about their relationship and Noni tells her mother that even after her suicide attempt, Macy continued to focus only on her career to the detriment of her happiness and mental health. Noni fires Macy as her manager. Meanwhile, Kaz has begun a political campaign and reflects on whether his career should take precedence over his personal happiness. Inspired by Kaz's honesty, Noni gives a television interview where she admits to having attempted suicide and says she is getting help. Noni prepares for her first live performance in London, and shortly before going onstage suddenly encounters Kaz, who has taken a flight there and expresses his love for her. Noni performs a song she has written to an enthusiastic audience. She brings Kaz onstage, tells him that she loves him too, and they embrace.

Cast
 Gugu Mbatha-Raw as Noni Jean
 Minnie Driver as Macy Jean
 Nate Parker as Kaz Nicol
 Danny Glover as Captain David Nicol
 Machine Gun Kelly as Kid Culprit
 Aisha Hinds as J Stanley
 Jordan Belfi as Steve Sams
 Hayley Marie Norman as Shai
 Tom Wright as Reverend Brown
 Jesse Woodrow as Carl
 Jasmine Vargas as the waitress in the night club

Production
On August 15, 2013, Relativity Media bought the worldwide rights to the film, originally titled Blackbird. Relativity Media also financed and distributed the film. Ryan Kavanaugh produced along with Stephanie Allain. On December 6, 2013, Relativity set the film for a November 14, 2014 release date.

Casting
Three stars—Gugu Mbatha-Raw, Nate Parker, and Danny Glover—were already in the ensemble cast on August 15; Raw played Noni Jean, a new singer. Parker played Kaz Nicol and Glover played Captain David Nicol. On September 25, 2013, Minnie Driver and Machine Gun Kelly also joined the cast; Driver played Noni's mother Macy Jean while Machine Gun Kelly played Kid Culprit, a rapper.

Filming
Principal photography commenced on August 21, 2013, in Los Angeles.

Soundtrack

Relativity Music Group released a soundtrack album for the film on November 10, 2014, which features the original song "Grateful", written by Diane Warren and performed by Rita Ora. Three songs featured in the film but absent from the soundtrack are Beyoncé's "Drunk in Love," India.Arie's "I Am Light" and Amel Larrieux's "Don't Let Me Down" as they already appear on each artist's respective albums.

Reception

Critical response
On Rotten Tomatoes, the film holds an approval rating of 83% based on 93 reviews, with an average rating of 6.70/10. The website's critical consensus reads: "Thanks to smart direction and a powerhouse performance from Gugu Mbatha-Raw, Beyond the Lights transcends its formulaic storyline to deliver thoroughly entertaining drama." On Metacritic, the film has a weighted average score of 73 out of 100, based on 25 critics, indicating "generally favorable reviews". Audiences polled by CinemaScore gave the film an average grade of "A" on an A+ to F scale.

The Hollywood Reporter praised Mbatha-Raw's performance as "incandescent" and Prince-Bythewood's script for its "surprising integrity." Hitfix said the film's excellence showed that writer/director "Gina Prince-Bythewood isn't working enough," while Variety called it "messy but undeniably entertaining."

Accolades

See also
 List of black films of the 2010s

References

External links
 
 
 
 

2014 films
2014 romantic drama films
American independent films
African-American romantic drama films
Films about music and musicians
Films about police officers
Films about suicide
Films directed by Gina Prince-Bythewood
Films set in Mexico
Films set in London
Films set in Los Angeles
Films shot in Los Angeles
Relativity Media films
Films scored by Mark Isham
2014 independent films
Films about mother–daughter relationships
2010s English-language films
2010s American films